Benjamin Proud (born 21 September 1994) is an English competitive swimmer, representing Great Britain at the Olympic Games, the FINA World Aquatics Championships and LEN European Aquatics Championships, and England at the Commonwealth Games. Proud specialises in sprint freestyle and butterfly races, specifically the 50-metre distance in both. He is the 2022 World Champion in the 50 metre freestyle, his second long course world title. He is the 2017 world champion in the 50-metre butterfly. He is only the third male swimmer to be simultaneously short-course and long-course World Champion at 50 metre freestyle, after César Cielo and Florent Manaudou.

Away from national duties, Proud currently represents Energy Standard in the International Swimming League.

Proud holds two British national records, as well as being a double Commonwealth Games champion in both the 50 m butterfly (2014 and 2022) and 50 m freestyle (2014 and 2018) events.  He was European Champion over 50 metres freestyle in 2018, and was part of the 4 x 100 medley team from Great Britain which won European gold in 2014.

Early life and education
Proud was born in London on 21 September 1994 to Nic and Sally Proud. The family moved to Malaysia when he was five months old, and he grew up in Damansara, Kuala Lumpur. He has a brother, Oliver. He attended the Alice Smith School from kindergarten until year 12 of the school. At Alice Smith, he competed for the school and was trained by Francis Kiu, a professional Malaysian swimmer. He swam for the school swimming team, KLASS Torpedoes, representing them at many international swim meets. He swam at the Malaysian Open, winning the 50 m butterfly and placing second in the 50 m freestyle. His many swim meets across Southeast Asia included the Flying Fish meet in Phuket, Thailand.

In 2011, when he was 16, he returned to England to pursue swimming as a career, and joined Plymouth College as a swimming scholar. After finishing school, he attended University of St Mark & St John where he studied for a Sports Development & Coaching degree. Proud was coached by Jon Rudd at the Plymouth Leander Swimming Programme in England, before he moved to train at the Energy Standard International Swim Club in Turkey in 2017.

Swimming career
Proud won a silver medal in the 50 m butterfly -his strongest event- in the European Junior Championships, which put him on the map as the fastest British sprinter at the British Gas International Meet in 2013, winning a gold in the butterfly, and going on later to win a silver in the 50 m freestyle in Leeds. After his initial victories, he rose through the ranks and broke the decade-long 50 m butterfly standing record twice, in the semis and final, giving him his first British Gas Swimming Championship title at the age of 19.

He went on the break his personal best times for the 50 m and 100 m freestyle events, earning himself a silver and bronze, as well as a spot on the British team for the 2013 World Championships being held in Barcelona. Unsurprisingly, Proud did incredibly, finishing 18th in the 50 m freestyle, and 11th in the 50 m butterfly. In 2014, still only 19 years old, Proud won his first senior international medals on his Commonwealth debut for England at Glasgow. The following month, Proud won a gold in the 4 × 100 m medley relay and a bronze in the 50 m butterfly for Team GB at his first European Championships.

In the 2016 European Aquatics Championships in London, he won two bronze medals, first in 50m butterfly, then in 50m freestyle.

Proud represents Great Britain in the 50 m and 100 m freestyle events at the 2016 Summer Olympics.

2017
At the 2017 World Aquatics Championships, Proud qualified as the fourth fastest swimmer at the 50m butterfly semi-finals, but won a surprise gold at the final with a national record time of 22.75 seconds. He won a further bronze in the 50m freestyle in 21.43 seconds.

2018–2019
At the 2018 Commonwealth Games held at the Gold Coast, Australia, Proud won silver as part of the relay team with David Cumberlidge, Jarvis Parkinson and James Guy that came second in the  freestyle events. He broke his own Games record in the heats of the 50m freestyle with 21.45 seconds, then 21.30 in the semi-finals and went on to win the final in 21.35. He also won a silver in the  medley with Adam Peaty, James Guy and Luke Greenbank. He broke his own 50m freestyle British record at the Sette Colli meet in Rome, posting a Commonwealth record of 21.16 in the final to become the 4th fastest performer of all time over the distance.

At the 2018 European Championships in Glasgow, Proud won a silver in the 50-metre butterfly. He then broke the 50-meter freestyle textile world record with 21.11 in the semi-finals of the 50-metre freestyle, and won his first gold of the European championships in the final.

In the Autumn of 2019 he was member of the inaugural International Swimming League swimming for the Energy Standard Swim Club, who won the team title in Las Vegas, Nevada, in December.

2021–22
At the European Championships held in Budapest in May 2021, Proud won a silver in the 50 m freestyle.

A year later, at the 2022 World Aquatics Championships held in Budapest, Proud won gold in the 50 m freestyle event.

Proud took part in the 2022 Commonwealth Games, and won a gold in the 50 m butterfly event.

Best times

British Record*

See also
List of Commonwealth Games medallists in swimming (men)

References

External links
 
 
 
 
 
 
 

1994 births
Living people
British male swimmers
Male butterfly swimmers
British male freestyle swimmers
Sportspeople from London
British emigrants to Malaysia
Swimmers at the 2014 Commonwealth Games
Swimmers at the 2018 Commonwealth Games
Swimmers at the 2022 Commonwealth Games
Commonwealth Games medallists in swimming
Commonwealth Games gold medallists for England
Commonwealth Games silver medallists for England
Commonwealth Games bronze medallists for England
Olympic swimmers of Great Britain
Swimmers at the 2016 Summer Olympics
Swimmers at the 2020 Summer Olympics
European Aquatics Championships medalists in swimming
World Aquatics Championships medalists in swimming
Medalists at the FINA World Swimming Championships (25 m)
People educated at Plymouth College
Sportspeople from Kuala Lumpur
Medallists at the 2018 Commonwealth Games